Clark County is a county in the U.S. state of Wisconsin. As of the 2020 census, the population was 34,659. Its county seat is Neillsville.

History
By the early 1800s, the land and streams that are now Clark County were the hunting grounds of Chippewa, Dakota, Ho-Chunk and possibly Menominee peoples. In 1836 these Indians were joined by a party of French-Canadian fur traders who started a temporary post for the American Fur Company on the Black River's East Fork.

The next White arrival was probably Mormon loggers in 1844, come to cut pine logs from the forests along the Black River and float them down to a sawmill at Black River Falls. From there the sawed wood would be floated down the river to be used in construction of the Mormon temple in Nauvoo, Illinois. They had camps on the river at what is called Mormon Riffle, a mile below Neillsville, near Weston's Rapids, and south of Greenwood. This project probably ended by 1846, when most of the Mormons headed west after the murder of Joseph Smith.

In June of 1845, James and Henry O'Neill led a party overland from Black River Falls, cutting a road up through the brush, with a wagon of tools and supplies pulled by oxen. They built a cabin on O'Neill Creek, then a sawmill. Lumber sawed by the mill was rafted down the river to Black River Falls, and from there to Alexander O'Neill in Burlington, Iowa. Not all was good, as a storm in June 1847 flooded the Black River and took out all mills then existing. But the pioneers rebuilt.

Clark County was founded in 1853 and organized the following year. It was named for A. W. Clark, an early settler, or for General George Rogers Clark.

Electricity became available around 1900 in some of the towns and villages from private power plants - e.g. in 1902 the Paulsen mill began offering electrical service within the village of Withee. For farms out in the country, it took another 35 years, with  electric lines finally put up starting around 1937 by the new Clark Electric Cooperative, funded by a loan from the New Deal Rural Electrification Administration.

In 1920 construction began on the Clark County Asylum two miles east of Owen - the forerunner of today's Clark County Rehab and Living Center. It was the last built of a network of 35 county mental hospitals in Wisconsin, providing long-term care for patients who were unlikely to recover. Twelve patients from the Wausau asylum helped with construction, and they became the first patients. Some of the patients farmed, both keeping themselves busy and supplying the facility. In 1924 they grew 60 acres of corn, 25 acres of potatoes, 16 acres of barley, 40 acres of oats, 6 acres of buckwheat, and 3 acres of millet. Soon a dairy herd was added, and hogs and a slaughterhouse by 1948. Over the years the institution's mission has shifted from "custodial asylum" to "treatment hospital," to skilled nursing facility.

Geography

Adjacent counties
 Taylor County – north
 Marathon County – east
 Wood County – southeast
 Jackson County – south
 Eau Claire County – west
 Chippewa County – northwest

Major highways

Railroads
Union Pacific
Watco
Canadian National

Buses
List of intercity bus stops in Wisconsin

Airport
 KVIQ - Neillsville Municipal Airport

Climate

Demographics and religion statistics

2020 census
As of the census of 2020, the population was 34,659. The racial makeup of the county was 92.2% White, 0.5% Native American, 0.3% Black or African American, 0.3% Asian, 3.4% from other races, and 3.2% from two or more races. Ethnically, the population was 6.1% Hispanic or Latino of any race.

2000 census

As of the census of 2000, there were 33,557 people, 12,047 households, and 8,673 families residing in the county.  The population density was 28 people per square mile (11/km2). There were 13,531 housing units at an average density of 11 per square mile (4/km2). The racial makeup of the county was 98.05% White, 0.13% Black or African American, 0.48% Native American, 0.30% Asian, 0.01% Pacific Islander, 0.56% from other races, and 0.47% from two or more races. 1.20% of the population were Hispanic or Latino of any race. 54.0% were of German, 9.0% Polish, 6.2% Norwegian and 6.1% United States or American ancestry. 6.62% reported speaking German, Pennsylvania Dutch, or Dutch at home; an additional 1.34% speak Spanish.

There were 12,047 households, out of which 35.00% had children under the age of 18 living with them, 61.20% were married couples living together, 6.50% had a female householder with no husband present, and 28.00% were non-families. 23.80% of all households were made up of individuals, and 12.60% had someone living alone who was 65 years of age or older. The average household size was 2.73 and the average family size was 3.27.

In the county, the population was spread out, with 29.90% under the age of 18, 7.70% from 18 to 24, 26.20% from 25 to 44, 20.20% from 45 to 64, and 16.00% who were 65 years of age or older. The median age was 36 years. For every 100 females there were 100.50 males. For every 100 females age 18 and over, there were 98.70 males.

In 2017, there were 554 births, giving a general fertility rate of 99.2 births per 1000 women aged 15–44, the second highest rate out of all 72 Wisconsin counties. 184 of the births occurred at home, more than any other Wisconsin county.

In 2010, the largest religious groups by reported number of adherents in Clark County were Catholic at 9,535 adherents, Missouri Synod Lutheran at 2,459 adherents, ELCA Lutheran at 2,281 adherents, Amish at 1,986 adherents, United Church of Christ at 959 adherents, Wisconsin Synod Lutheran at 891 adherents, and United Methodist at 577 adherents.

Communities

Cities

 Abbotsford (partly in Marathon County)
 Colby (partly in Marathon County)
 Greenwood
 Loyal
 Neillsville (county seat)
 Owen
 Thorp
 Stanley (mostly in Chippewa County)

Villages
 Curtiss
 Dorchester (partly in Marathon County)
 Granton
 Unity (mostly in Marathon County)
 Withee

Towns

 Beaver
 Butler
 Colby
 Dewhurst
 Eaton
 Foster
 Fremont
 Grant
 Green Grove
 Hendren
 Hewett
 Hixon
 Hoard
 Levis
 Longwood
 Loyal
 Lynn
 Mayville
 Mead
 Mentor
 Pine Valley
 Reseburg
 Seif
 Sherman
 Sherwood
 Thorp
 Unity
 Warner
 Washburn
 Weston
 Withee
 Worden
 York

Census-designated places
 Chili
 Humbird

Unincorporated communities

 Atwood
 Bright
 Christie
 Clark
 Columbia
 Eadsville
 Eidsvold
 Globe
 Hemlock
 Junction
 Lombard
 Longwood
 Lynn
 Nevins
 Reseburg
 Riplinger
 Sherwood
 Shortville
 Tioga
 Sidney
 Spokeville
 Veefkind
 Willard

Ghost towns/neighborhoods
 Kurth
 Maple Works
 Romeo
 Trow
 Worden

Religion

In 2013 there were 16 Amish church districts in Clark County.

Politics

See also
 National Register of Historic Places listings in Clark County, Wisconsin

References

Further reading
 Biographical History of Clark and Jackson Counties, Wisconsin. Chicago: Lewis Publishing, 1891.
 Clark County: The Garden of Wisconsin. Neillsville, Wis.: Satterlee and Tifft, 1890.
 Curtiss-Wedge, Franklyn (comp.) History of Clark County Wisconsin. Chicago: H. C. Cooper, Jr., 1918.

External links

 Clark County government website
 Clark County Economic Development Corporation 
 Clark County map from the Wisconsin Department of Transportation

 
1854 establishments in Wisconsin
Populated places established in 1854